This is a list of famous Mexican artists (in alphabetical order):

Illustrators, graphists

Angélica Argüelles Kubli (born 1963)
Alberto Beltrán (1923–2002)
Ángel Bracho (1911–2005)
Celia Calderón (1921–1969)
Federico Cantú Garza (1907–1989)
Alexander Cañedo (1902–1978)
Casimiro Castro (1826–1889)
Erasto Cortés Juárez (1900–1972)
José Luis Cuevas (1934–2017)
Francisco Díaz de León (1897–1975)
Francisco Dosamantes (1911–1986)
Rodolfo Escalera (1929–2000)
Jesús Escobedo (1918–1978)
Andrea Gómez (1926–2012)
Oscar González Loyo (1959–2021)
Hesiquio Iriarte (ca 1820–1903)
Sarah Jiménez (1927–2017)
Leopoldo Méndez (1902–1969)
Adolfo Mexiac (1927–2019)
Francisco Moreno Capdevila (1926–1995)
Isidoro Ocampo (1910–1983)
Mariano Paredes (1912–1980)
José Guadalupe Posada (1852–1913)
Humberto Ramos (born 1970)
Julio Ruelas (1870–1907)
Francisco Eduardo Tresguerras (1759–1833)
Zalathiel Vargas (born 1941)
Héctor Xavier (1921–1994) 
Gerardo Yepiz (born 1970)
Angel Zamarripa (1912–1990)

Multimedia, multiple media
Gilberto Aceves Navarro (1931–2019)
Carlos Amorales (born 1970)
Federico Cantú Garza (1907–1989)
Fernando Castro Pacheco (1918–2013)
Vladimir Cora (born 1951)
Pedro Coronel (1922–1985)
Germán Cueto (1883–1975)
Lola Cueto (1897–1978)
Gabriel Fernández Ledesma (1900–1983)
Demián Flores (born 1971)
Leopoldo Flores (1934–2016)
Gelsen Gas (1933–2015)
Carmen Gayón (born 1951)
José Antonio Gómez Rosas (1916-1977)
Francisco Guevara (born 1978)
Miguel Hernández Urbán (1936–2017)
Rafael Lozano-Hemmer (born 1967)
Ofelia Márquez Huitzil (born 1959)
Aliria Morales (born 1950)
Carlos Nakatani (1934–2004)
Leonardo Nierman (born 1932)
Carlos Orozco Romero (1896–1984)
Gabriel Orozco (born 1962)
Ruben Ortiz Torres (born 1964)
Feliciano Peña (1915–1982).
Pedro Preux (1932–2011)
Antonio Pujol (1913–1995)
Mario Reyes (1926–2017)
José Reyes Meza (1924–2011)
Waldemar Sjölander (1908–1988)
Valetta Swann (1904–1973)
Beatriz Zamora (born 1935)

Painters

Colonial era 1521-1821

Juan Francisco de Aguilera (active in the last third of the 18th century)
José de Alcíbar (ca 1730–1803)
Ignacio Maria Barreda, single canvas casta painting 1777
Miguel Cabrera (ca 1695–1768)
José del Castillo (active in the last third of the 18th century)
Juan Correa (ca 1645–1716)
Nicolás Correa (ca 1660-ca 1729)
Baltasar de Echave Ibía (1585/1605 – 1644)
Baltasar de Echave y Rioja (1632–1682)
Nicolás Enríquez (active between 1726 and 1787)
Juan Gerson, Nahua artist, active 1562
Xavier Guerrero (1896–1974)
José de Ibarra, casta paintings
José Juárez (1617–1661)
Luis Juárez (c. 1585 – 1639)
Luis Lagarto (c. 1556 – 1620)
Sebastián López de Arteaga (1610–1652)
Alonso López de Herrera (c. 1585-ca. 1675)
Andrés López (active between 1763 and 1811)
José Joaquín Magón, produced two sets of 18th c. casta paintings
Luis de Mena
José de Mora (active in the first half of the 18th century)
Juan Patricio Morlete Ruiz (1713–1772)
José de Páez (1720-ca 1790)
Antonio Pėrez de Aguilar (active in the mid-18th century)
Hipólito de Rioja (active in the 2nd half of the 17th century)
Antonio Rodríguez (1636–1691)
Juan Rodríguez Juárez (1675–1728)
Nicolás Rodríguez Juárez (1667–1734)
Miguel Rudecindo Contreras (active in the mid-18th century)
José Francisco Xavier de Salazar y Mendoza (1750–1802), painter
Diego de Sanabria (active in the last third of the 18th century)
José María Vásquez (1763-ca 1826)
Cristóbal de Villalpando (c. 1649 – 1714)
Joaquín Villegas (1713 – after 1753)

Foreign artists that worked extensively in Colonial Mexico

Baltasar de Echave Orio (c. 1558-ca. 1623)
Francisco Clapera (1746–1810)
Rafael Ximeno y Planes (1759–1825)

Post-independence period 1821- 

Amelia Abascal (born 1920)
Ignacio Aguirre (1900–1990)
Rodolfo Aguirre Tinoco (born 1927)
Armando Ahuatzi (born 1950)
Ramón Alva de la Canal (1892–1985)
Jesús Álvarez Amaya (1925–2010)
Raúl Anguiano (1915–2006)
Luis Y. Aragón (born 1939)
Gustavo Arias Murueta (1923–2019)
Javier Arevalo (1937–2020)
Luis Arenal Bastar (1909–1985)
Dr. Atl (1875–1964)
Abelardo Ávila (1907–1967)
Ignacio Asúnsolo (1890–1965)
Santos Balmori (1899–1992)
Sofía Bassi (1913–1998)
Ignacio Barrios (1930–2013)
Arnold Belkin (1930–1992)
Angelina Beloff (1879–1969)
Roberto Berdecio (1910–1996)
Helen Bickham (born 1935)
Hermenegildo Bustos (1832–1907)
Rosario Cabrera (1901–1975)
Sebastián Canovas (born 1957)
Gonzalo Carrasco (1859–1936)
Julio Carrasco Bretón (born 1950)
Leonora Carrington (1917–2011)
Fidencio Castillo (1907–1993)
Elizabeth Catlett (1915–2012) 
Guillermo Ceniceros (born 1939)
José Chávez Morado (1909–2002)
Miguel Condé (born 1939)
Jesus Contreras Peña (1918–1992)
Juan Cordero (1822–1884)
Salvador Corona (1895–1990)
Francisco Corzas (1936–1983)
Olga Costa (1913–1993)
Luis Coto (1830–1891)
Miguel Covarrubias (1904–1957)
José Víctor Crowley (born 1935)
Nicolás Cuéllar
Azteca de Gyves (born 1963)
Olga Dondé (1937–2004)
Roberto Donis (1934–2008)
Manuel Echauri (1914–2001)
Enrique Echeverría (1923–1972)
Francisco Eppens Helguera (1913–1990)
Arturo Estrada Hernández (born 1925)
José María Estrada (1810–1862)
Antonio Fabrés (1854–1938)
Luis Filcer (1927–2018)
Rafael Flores (1832–1886)
Pedro Friedeberg (born 1936)
Alberto Fuster (1870–1922)
Julio Galán (1958–2006)
Byron Galvez (1941–2009)
Vicente Gandía (1935–2009)
José Julio Gaona (born 1943)
Arturo García Bustos (1926–2017)
José García Narezo (1922–1994)
Antonio García Vega (born 1954)
Mauricio García Vega (born 1944)
Germán Gedovius (1867–1937)
Gunther Gerzso (1915–2000)
Jorge González Camarena (1908–1980)
Antonio González Orozco (1933–2020)
A. González Pineda (active in the last third of the 19th century)
Alfredo Guati Rojo (1918–2003)
Jesús Guerrero Galván (1910–1973)
Eloísa Jiménez Gutiérrez (1908–1990)
Judith Gutierrez (1927–2003)
Rodrigo Gutierrez (1848–1903)
Jesús Helguera (1910–1971)
José Hernández Delgadillo (1927–2000)
Desiderio Hernández Xochitiotzin (1922–2007)
Saturnino Herrán (1887–1918)
Rodolfo Hurtado (1940–2005)
Francisco Icaza (1930–2014)
Ernesto Icaza Sánchez (1866–1935)
Leandro Izaguirre (1867–1941)
María Izquierdo (1902–1955)
Jazzamoart (born 1951)
José María Jara (1866–1939)
José Jiménez (1830–1859)
Frida Kahlo (1907–1954)
Myra Landau
Eugenio Landesio (1810–1879)
Agustín Lazo Adalid (1896–1971)
Joy Laville (1923–2018)
Rina Lazo (1923–2019)
Fernando Leal (1896–1964)
Arturo Lemus Beltran (born 1978)
Manuel Lepe Macedo (1936–1984)
Marcela Lobo Crenier (born 1959)
Julia López (born 1936)
Amador Lugo Guadarrama (1921–2002)
Leonel Maciel (born 1939)
Héctor Martínez Arteche (1934–2011)
Ricardo Martínez de Hoyos (1918–2009)
Daniel Manrique (1939–2010)
Eliana Menassé
Arnulfo Mendoza (1954–2014)
Carlos Mérida (1891–1984)
Benito Messeguer (1930–1982)
Guillermo Meza (1917–1997)
Alfonso Michel (1897–1957)
Luis Monroy (1845–1918)
Roberto Montenegro (1885–1968)
Gustavo Montoya (1905–2003)
Francisco Mora (1922–2002)
Rodolfo Morales (1925–2001)
Rodolfo Moreno (1923–2012)
Fumiko Nakashima (born 1981)
Carl Nebel
Nefero (1920–2005)
Rodolfo Nieto (1936–1985)
Luis Nishizawa (1918–2014)
José Maria Obregón (1832–1902)
Manuel Ocaranza (1841–1882)
Juan O'Gorman (1905–1982)
Pablo O'Higgins (1904–1983)
José Clemente Orozco (1883–1949)
Ignacio Ortiz (born 1934)
Mario Orozco Rivera (1930–1998)
Sandra Pani (born 1964)
Félix Parra (1845–1919) 
Tomás Parra (born 1937)
Antonio Peláez (1921–1994)
José Salomé Pina (1830–1909)
Aarón Piña Mora (1914–2009)
Fanny Rabel (1922–2008)
Alice Rahon (1904–1987)
Joaquín Ramírez (ca 1839–1866)
Santiago Rebull (1829–1902)
Jesús Reyes Ferreira (1880–1977)
Diego Rivera (1886–1957)
Antonio Rodríguez Luna (1910–1985)
Manuel Rodríguez Lozano (1894?-1971)
José Luis Romo Martín (1954–2016) 
Ingrid Rosas (born 1967)
Antonio M. Ruíz (1892–1964)
Veronica Ruiz de Velasco (born 1968)
Diana Salazar (born 1972)
Herlinda Sanchez Laurel (1941–2019)
David Alfaro Siqueiros (1896–1974)
Rufino Tamayo (1899–1991)
Francisco Toledo (1941–2019)
Mauricio Toussaint (born 1960)
Filemón Treviño (born 1969)
Lucinda Urrusti (born 1929)
Cordelia Urueta (1908–1995)
Francisco Antonio Vallejo (1722–1785)
Luis Valsoto (born 1939)
Rafael Vargas-Suarez a.k.a. Vargas-Suarez Universal (born 1972)
Remedios Varo (1908–1963)
Manuel Ignacio Vásquez (active between 1806 and 1835)
José María Velasco Gómez (1840–1912)
Lourdes Villagomez (born 1984)
Vlady (1920–2005)
Shino Watabe (born 1970)
Ángel Zárraga (1886–1946)
Nahum B. Zenil (born 1947)
Alfredo Zalce (1908–2003)
José Zúñiga (born 1937)
Celso Zubire (born 1947)

Photographers
Manuel Álvarez Bravo (1902–2002)
Colette Álvarez Urbajtel (1934–2020)
Enrique Bostelmann (1939–2003)
Agustín Casasola (1874–1928)
Blanca Charolet (born 1953)
Héctor García Cobo (1923–2012)
Maya Goded (born 1967)
Graciela Iturbide (born 1942)
Guillermo Kahlo (1871–1941)
Paulina Lavista (born 1945)
Nacho López (1923–1986)
Teresa Margolles (born 1963)
Pedro Meyer (born 1935)
Dulce Pinzon (born 1974)
Walter Reuter (1906–2005)
Mariana Yampolsky (1925–2002)

Sculptors
Clemente Islas Allende (1892–1938)
Adalberto Álvarez Marines
Feliciano Béjar (1920–2007)
Juan Bellido (ca 1829-?)
Geles Cabrera (born 1929)
Sergio Bustamante
Federico Cantú Garza (1907–1989)
Francisco Cárdenas Martínez
Rosa Castillo (1910–1989)
Elizabeth Catlett (1915–2012)
Pedro Cervantes (1933–2020)
Jesus F. Contreras (1866–1902)
Arnulfo Domínguez Bello (active in the first half of the 20th century)
Manuel Felguerez (1928–2020)
Mathias Goeritz (1916–1990)
 Fernando González Gortázar
Enrique Guerra (1871–1943)
Gabriel Guerra (1847–1893)
Ángela Gurría (born 1929)
Pedro Patiňo Ixtolinque (1774–1834)
Heriberto Juárez (1932–2008)
Pablo Kubli (born 1953)
José María Labastida (ca 1800-ca 1849)
Tosia Malamud (1923–2008)
Mary Martin (1907–1969)
Ricardo Martínez Herrera (born 1989)
Deyanira África Melo
Luis Ortiz Monasterio (1906–1990)
Enrique Guerra (1871–1943)
Fidencio Lucano Nava (1869–1938)
Agustín Parra Echauri
Abel Ramírez Águilar (1943–2021)
Marina Pombar (born 1947)
María Luisa Reid (born 1943)
Dionicio Rodriguez (1891–1955)
José Sacal (1944–2018)
Sebastián (born 1947)
Naomi Siegmann (1933–2018)
Felipe Sojo (1833–1869)
Juan Soriano (1920–2006)
Manuel Vilar (1812–1860)
Álvaro Zardoni (born 1964)
Francisco Zúñiga (1912–1998)

See also 
 List of Latin American artists
 List of Mexican architects
 List of Mexican artisans
 List of Mexicans

References

Mexican
Artists